Ozias Andrew Johnson Jr. (August 26, 1910 – December 1980) was an American football and basketball coach. He served as the second head football coach at the Louisiana Negro Normal and Industrial Institute—now known as Grambling State University—in Grambling, Louisiana and he held that position for the 1934 season, compiling a record of 0–2. 
Johnson coached the school's basketball team from 1940 to 1942.

Johnson was also the postmaster of Grambling, Louisiana while he coached.

References

1910 births
1980 deaths
Basketball coaches from Louisiana
Grambling State Tigers football coaches
Grambling State Tigers men's basketball coaches
People from Natchitoches Parish, Louisiana